Elections for the London Borough of Merton were held on 5 May 1994 to elect members of Merton London Borough Council in London, England. This was on the same day as other local elections in England.

The whole council was up for election. As a result of changes in authority boundaries between Merton, Lambeth and Wandsworth, there were some minor ward boundary changes.

Results
The Labour Party maintained its majority control of the council, increasing its majority from one seat to eleven seats.

This was the first election in which the Liberal Democrats gained seats in Merton, winning all three seats on the ward of West Barnes from the Conservatives. The Liberal Democrats had not stood in the ward in the last election, and their predecessors, the SDP-Liberal Alliance, came last in the ward in the 1986 election, behind the Conservatives and Labour.

This was also the last election which was contested by the Longthornton and Tamworth Residents Association, which lost two seats to Labour and whose only elected councillor no longer sat for the party by the time of the 1998 election.

Results by Ward

References

1994
1994 London Borough council elections